Johannes Kirk (3 March 1924 – 20 November 2010) was a German footballer who played as a defender for Werder Bremen and Hannover 96. He later became Hannover 96's manager in the 1960s. He was also part of the Germany national team's squad for the football tournament at the 1952 Summer Olympics, but he did not play in any matches.

References

External links
 

1924 births
2010 deaths
German footballers
Association football defenders
SV Werder Bremen players
Hannover 96 players
German football managers
Hannover 96 managers